Gary Fila (born 18 November 1981) is Australian rules football field umpire in the Australian Football League. Prior to joining the senior list, he umpired in the South Australian National Football League, and officiated in both the 2005 and 2006 SANFL grand finals. He made his AFL début on 30 June 2007, in a match between Fremantle and Carlton at Subiaco Oval.

At the end of the 2008 AFL Season, Fila was delisted from the AFL Panel after 16 matches. However, he spent 2009 and 2010 working hard to improve in the SANFL, in a bid to re-make the AFL. His effort was rewarded when he umpired the 2010 SANFL Grand Final alongside Richard Williams (11th Grand Final) and Leigh Haussen, who was making his Grand Final debut. He also won South Australia's most prestigious umpiring honour that year- the Golden Whistle- ranking him as the best field umpire in the state.

Fila subsequently re-trialed for the AFL and was rewarded with a rookie spot. Whilst this was a step in the right direction, it meant he had to have another successful year at SANFL level. He did so, umpiring his 4th SANFL Grand Final in 2011, alongside Colin Rowston (2nd) and Haussen (2nd). At the start of 2012, Fila was offered a senior spot on the AFL list, and had a successful return season, umpiring 20 matches .

At the beginning of February, 2014, Gary Fila was appointed as the new AFL Queensland State Umpire Manager.   In his new role, Fila will oversee the development of the state's NEAFL and QAFL umpires, with the view to giving them the best possible chance of making the AFL ranks, as well as ensuring there is a clear pathway through community football to elite umpiring.

The former SANFL umpire replaces Cameron Nash, who has become the AFL Victoria Umpires Manager.

Last season, Fila volunteered his time assisting the SANFL umpiring department with recruitment campaigns, liaising with schools to entice more young people to pick up the whistle.

Originally planning to head back to the SANFL and strive towards umpiring his 200th SANFL game, he opted to instead head down the coaching path in 2014.

Fila will draw on his experiences mentoring and developing umpires in the SANFL as he takes on the role of coaching Queensland's top flight officials.

Only giving up umpiring at the end of last season, Mr Fila has a strong understanding of the demands on high level umpires, and will take an active role in training and drills throughout the year.

AFL Queensland CEO Michael Conlan said he was delighted with the appointment.

"Gary is a great addition to the Umpiring Department here in Queensland," he said.

" Given his extensive experience within a high performance environment with the SANFL and the AFL, he is fully aware of what it takes to get to the top and will be able to instil that into our NEAFL and QAFL Umpiring Group.’

‘His background in his non-umpiring portfolio in Business Development will be beneficial in leading our Umpiring Department."

Beginning November 2015, Gary has been appointed as an AFL Assistant Coach at AFL Headquarters in Melbourne

References 

Australian Football League umpires
South Australian National Football League umpires
Living people
1981 births